Kildonan was a provincial electoral division in the Canadian province of Manitoba. The boundaries for the riding maintained their location through the 2008 redistribution.

History

Kildonan riding (1870–1899)

The original Kildonan riding was created at the time of the province's establishment in 1870.  It was dominated by Manitoba's "old settler" population (i.e., English-speaking families who had lived in the Red River Settlement for many years before the province's creation). There was a large "mixed blood" aboriginal population in the riding, and many of its residents were also of Scottish or partly Scottish ancestry.  From 1886 to 1888, the riding was incorporated into "Kildonan and St. Paul" riding.

Kildonan was a hotly contested riding between the Conservatives and Liberals following the establishment of party government in 1888.  In 1899, it was dissolved into the riding of "Kildonan and St. Andrews".

Kildonan and St. Andrews riding (1920–1927)

From 1920 to 1927, the Kildonan and St. Andrews riding was represented by Labour Member of the Legislative Assembly (MLA) Charles Tanner.  Otherwise, it continued to return Liberals and Conservatives until being merged into "Kildonan-Transcona" in 1949.  After that time, it was generally considered a safe riding for the Co-operative Commonwealth Federation.

Kildonan riding (1958–2019) 

A riding with the name Kildonan was reestablished in 1957, and formally came into being in the provincial election of 1958. It was located in the northeastern part of the current City of Winnipeg, The Kildonan riding that existed from the 1958 election up to the election of 1981 was located in the East Kildonan area on the east side of the Red River. The riding of Kildonan that existed since 1981 in northwest Winnipeg had completely different boundaries from the old Kildonan riding as this new Kildonan riding was carved out of the old Seven Oaks riding on the west side of the Red River. This new riding was bordered on the east by River East and Rossmere, to the south by St. Johns and Burrows, to the north by Gimli, and to the west by The Maples.

The riding's population in 1996 was 19,522. In 1999, the average family income was $54381, and the unemployment rate was 6.80%. Almost 18% of the population was above 65 years of age by 2016. Kildonan had a large immigrant population (23% of the total population in 1999), and was ethnically diverse. Ukrainians made up 14% of the riding's population; a further 11% were Jewish, 7% Polish, and 3% Italian. Kildonan's residents were primarily middle and upper-income. Manufacturing accounted for 16% of industry in the riding, with a further 15% in the service sector.

The seat was generally regarded as safe for the New Democratic Party. The Progressive Conservatives won the former Kildonan on the (east side of the Red River) in 1962 (by 4 votes in the 1962 election) and the Liberals won the Kildonan riding on the (west side of the Red River) in 1988. In both cases, the NDP recaptured the seat after a single term.

Beginning with the 2019 Manitoba general election, the Kildonan riding was dissolved and much of its constituency was redistributed to the new riding of Kildonan-River East, which also took in parts of St. Johns and the now-defunct River East riding. Kildonan's last MLA was Nic Curry, a young former officer in the Canadian Armed Forces Reserve.

Members of the Legislative Assembly

Kildonan riding (1870–1899)

(+) From 1886 to 1888, the riding was incorporated into Kildonan and St. Paul.

Kildonan and St. Andrews riding (1920–1927)

Kildonan-Transcona riding (1949–1958)

Kildonan riding (1961-2019)

Electoral results

1870 general election

1874 general election

1875 by-election

1878 general election

1879 general election

1882 by-election

1883 general election

1884 by-election

1886 general election

1888 general election

1890 by-election

1892 general election

1896 general election

1899 general election

1903 general election

1907 general election

1910 general election

1913 by-election

1914 general election

1915 general election

1920 general election

1922 general election

1927 general election

1932 general election

1936 general election

1941 general election

1945 general election

1949 general election

1953 general election

1958 general election

1959 general election

1962 general election

1966 general election

1969 general election

1973 general election

1977 general election

1981 general election

1985 by-election

1986 general election

1988 general election

1990 general election

1995 general election

1999 general election

2003 general election

2007 general election

2011 general election

2016 general election

References

Former provincial electoral districts of Manitoba
Politics of Winnipeg
1870 establishments in Manitoba
Kildonan (Manitoba electoral district)